The Samsung SGH-T669  is a 3G-capable mobile phone manufactured by Samsung. In the US it is also called the Samsung Gravity T; in Canada, the Samsung Gravity Touch.

Various experts have reviewed it. PCMag.com's Jamie Lendino praised the phone's comfortable keyboard, but criticized the phone's sluggish performance.

References

External links 

 SGH-T669 user manual. Samsung Telecommunications America, LLC.
 SGH-T669 repair advice. iFixit.

Samsung mobile phones
Mobile phones introduced in 2010